Bob Milano is an American college baseball coach.  He served as the head coach of the California Golden Bears baseball team from 1978 to 1999.

Early life and playing career
Bob Milano grew up in Oakland, California and attended Bishop O'Dowd High School, graduating in 1957. Milano went on to play baseball for the California Golden Bears in 1960 and 1961, leading the 1960 team in hitting with a 357 average. Milano played summer baseball for the Lloydminster Meridians in the Western Canada Baseball League in 1960 and 1961.

After graduating from Cal, Milano was a varsity assistant for the Cal baseball team, while playing for the Humboldt Crabs in the summers of 1962 and 1963, playing in the National Baseball Congress World Series in 1963.

Coaching career
After 10 years as head coach at Burlingame High School, Milano was an assistant coach at Cal under Jackie Jensen from 1974-1977, until he was chosen as the new Cal head coach in 1978.

Coach Milano returned to coach the Humboldt Crabs in 1979, with five of his Cal players, including Rod Booker, finishing with a record of 34-16 and a return trip to the NBC World Series in Wichita. Those five Cal players Coach Milano brought to the Crabs, formed the core of the 1980 Cal team who made the College World Series.  He was inducted into the Humboldt Crabs Hall of Fame in 2018.

In 22 years at Cal, Coach Milano compiled a record of 688-644-4 (.516). His teams made the postseason six times, making the College World Series in 1980, 1988 and 1992. His Cal teams produced numerous future Major Leaguers including Bob Melvin, Jeff Kent, Lance Blankenship, Darren Lewis, Xavier Nady, and Rod Booker.

Head coaching records

Source:

International coaching
USA Baseball Collegiate National Team Assistant Coach (1985)
USA Baseball Olympic Assistant Coach (1988)
USA Baseball Head Coach (1997)

References

External links
 Cal profile
 ABCA Hall of Fame profile
 California Athletics Hall of Fame profile
 San Mateo County Sports Hall of Fame

California Golden Bears baseball coaches
California Golden Bears baseball players
Baseball catchers
People from Oakland, California
University of California, Berkeley alumni